The following are the Iran national futsal team results in its official international matches.

Total

1990s

1992

1995

1996

1997

1999

Results by year

2000s

2000

2001

2002

2003

2004

2005

2006

2007

2008

2009

Results by year

2010s

2010

2011

2012

2013

2014

2015

2016

2017

2018

2019

Results by year

2020s

2020

2021

2022

Results by year

Note 
 1995 UAE Tournament not record complete
 2000 in Rio de Janeiro Four Nations Cup Iran 4-1 Belgium not record
 2013 Victory Day Women Cup Hungary vs Iran 2 – 2 (women mach record in men results)		
 Some U21 and U23 match record in Senior team results (two match in 2011 : Iran vs Russia 3 – 0 and Iran vs Russia 1 – 2 in U21 not Senior national team)
 futsal planet not record goals in extra time and record draw but win in extra time should be record win and win in penalty kicks should be record draw)
 Iran 20-2 Armenia in 2003 Tehran cup but record 10–2 in futsal planet.
 some of match between Iran U21 and other national A team but because of lack of power source like to futsal planet we count this matches in friendly and total results table in this page:
 2007 Iran u21 2-1 Thailand national team
 2007 Iran u21 2-2 Thailand national team
 2009 Iran u21 4-3 Thailand national team ( Kiaei2, M. Tayebi, Sharifzadeh )
 2009 Iran u21 1-6 Thailand national team
 2009 Iran u23 7-0 Kyrgyzstan national team ( Hassanzadeh3, Daneshvar2, Esmaeilpour, Javid )
 2009 Iran u23 3-1 Uzbekistan national team
 2010 Iran u21 0-4 Uzbekistan national team

References

External links
 Futsalplanet.com

results